Sarah Hall  is a stained glass artist from Canada. Sarah Hall is internationally recognized for her large-scale art glass installations and solar projects. Her work can be found in churches, synagogues, schools, and other commercial and public buildings in Canada, the US, and Europe.

Over the past decade Hall has pioneered a new direction in architectural glass in North America: merging artistic glass design with technical innovations related to green building and bird friendly glass. In 2019 her professional contributions and technical innovations in the field were recognized through her appointment to the Order of Canada.

Early life and education

Early life
Sarah Hall was born in Hamilton, Ontario in 1951, and grew up in the nearby town of Dundas. Her family’s home was on the edge of a ravine, and Hall was greatly inspired by the natural world around her. The Niagara Escarpment which encircles the Dundas Valley, was an important influence in the development of her work. 

Hall’s dream to become a stained glass artist began early. When she was 9, her father was Chairman of the Building Committee for their family’s church in Dundas. During the design phase for this project, Hall went along with her father and his committee as they looked church buildings. It was then that she decided to make stained glass windows her life’s work. As there were no classes in stained glass in Canada during the 1960s and early 1970s, Hall lived and worked for several years in Alberta photographing ghost towns for the Provincial Archives of Alberta, supported by a federal Opportunities for Youth grant.

Education
In 1974, Hall enrolled in the Creative Arts Department at Sheridan College where stained glass was offered as one of the classes. Following this, she was determined to find a full-time program in stained glass, and she next enrolled in the Architectural Glass Department at Swansea College of Art, Wales, UK. After receiving a Diploma in Architectural Glass from The City & Guilds of London Institute, Hall assisted Lawrence Lee ARCA, Master of the Glass Department at the Royal College of Art in London. Hall's studies were completed with a year in Jerusalem researching Middle Eastern techniques in glass, particularly the art of gold leafing.

Career

In 1980, Hall established her own stained glass studio in Toronto. For the first four years, her studio was in an old storefront at 94 Tecumseth Street. She then moved to 30 Portland Street, where she shared the fourth floor of a large former warehouse with fellow glass artists Robert Jekyll, Steven Brathwaite, Karl Schantz, and Andrew Kuntz, along with photographers Robert Burley and Andre Beneteau. An early supporter of Hall's work in glass was June Callwood who commissioned her work for Jessie’s Centre designed by architect Jack Diamond. Numerous projects were accomplished in this studio (1984 -1990) created in the traditional stained glass technique with glass painting and silver stain.

In 1990, the growing number of commissions necessitated another move to her own studio – a 3000 square foot space in an old General Electric factory at 1440 Dupont Street in Toronto. There, Hall established a fully equipped design and fabrication studio. Several craftsmen assisted Hall in her work including John Wilcox, Rosiland Sokolosky, Harold (Hap) Straker and William Lindsay. Glass techniques were expanded considerably in this time to include large murals based on gold leaf techniques (used in the project Scotia Plaza), reverse painted glass, sandblasting and glass etching with hydrofluoric acid. Towards the end of this period, Hall worked with craftsmen at Sattler Stained Glass Studio in Nova Scotia to facilitate larger projects. Her contribution to the built environment was honoured in 1997 by the Ontario Association of Architects "Allied Arts Award." She was elected in 2002 into membership of the Royal Canadian Academy of Art.  

As her projects continued to expand in size and complexity, Hall moved her fabrication work to the larger and better-equipped facilities in Germany; and by 2003, most of her work was being created under her artistic supervision at the studios of Glasmalerei Peters GmbH in Paderborn, Germany.

In 2004, Hall received a Chalmers Arts Fellowship from the Ontario Arts Council to research and include photovoltaic technology in her art glass installations. This initiated a deeper collaboration with Glasmalerei Peters. The first demonstration of PV technology was the "Northern Light" project co-ordinated by Concordia University at the Solar Decathlon in Washington, DC in 2005. In 2008, Hall and architect Clive Grout received an award from the American Institute of Architects for "Lux Nova", their photovoltaic art glass installation at Regent College, UBC. Canadian violinist Oliver Schroer composed music for "Lux Nova" and several concerts of his music were held at the studio. 

An important mentor for Hall’s work in solar power was the physicist Ursula Franklin. A project called the "Wisdom Windows" honouring Rose Wolfe and the women of Massey College was commissioned by Master of the College John Fraser as a result of this mentorship. In 2008, Hall completed a building integrated photovoltaic (BIPV) project for Grass Valley School in Camus, WA. This was followed by "Leaves of Light", at the Life Sciences Building at York University, and the "Waterglass" solar art facades at Harbourfront Centre. Hall’s most extensive solar project has been the monumental south windows entitled "Lux Gloria" at The Cathedral of the Holy Family in Saskatoon, Saskatchewan. This is one of the sunniest cities in Canada with over 2268 hours of sunlight per year, and with more than a thousand solar cells in this installation, the Cathedral provides power to the electrical grid. Although the focus was on solar integration in this period many projects were created in other techniques including glass mosaic, appliqué, screen-printing and fused glass.  

In her most recent work, Hall continues to explore innovative approaches to pressing environmental issues. In addition to bringing third generation photovoltaics (organic solar cells) into architecture, she is looking for ways to mitigate the worldwide problem of bird strike. This man-made plague causes some 100 million bird fatalities per year caused by bird-skyscraper collisions. Hall is working with researchers at the American Bird Conservancy to integrate new patterns and surfaces in architectural glass that will warn birds away and collect energy from sunlight at the same time.

Throughout her career Hall has sought to improve human environments through the medium of architectural glass.  Over the years she has discovered creative ways to tackle global problems while maintaining the aesthetic integrity of her works - finding ways to develop greater energy autonomy and to live in harmony with the natural world.

A Selection of Solar Works

A Selection from A Thousand Colours Sarah Hall Glass

Awards and recognition
Hall's work has received several International First Place Awards for outstanding Liturgical art from both the Interfaith Forum on Religion, Art and Architecture, and Ministry and Liturgy. In 2002 she was elected to membership in the Royal Canadian Academy of Art. In 2019 Sarah Hall was appointed to the Order of Canada in recognition of her lifelong contributions as an architectural glass artist and for her technical innovations.

In 2017, the glass studio under Koen Vanderstukken at Sheridan College founded the Sarah Hall Glass Library.  A collection of over 300 glass samples were donated to the Honours Bachelor of Craft and Design (Glass) program. This resource is available to the students of glass blowing at Sheridan College and to the public by appointment. 

In 2018, the project records of Sarah Hall Studio were acquired by the Baldwin Collection of Canadiana, located at the Toronto Reference Library.

Books and Articles
Hall has written or co-authored three books:

 The Color of Light was published by LTP, Archdiocese of Chicago in 1999 and is the first book of its kind for the field of stained glass: a resource guide for those commissioning stained glass.
 Windows on our Soul; A Spiritual Excavation (with co-author Bob Shantz), was published by Novalis in 2007. The book is based on Hall's series of windows inspired by early Christian imagery.
 Transfiguring Prairie Skies: Stained Glass at Cathedral of the Holy Family (with co-author Donald Bolen), was published by The Roman Catholic Diocese of Saskatoon in 2012. The book explores the design and creation of the monumental stained glass windows at Cathedral of the Holy Family in Saskatoon, Saskatchewan.

In addition, Hall has written numerous articles for Glass Art Magazine and other publications, covering topics related to the art of stained glass, commissioning, the creative process, and practical considerations for designing and fabricating architectural glass art.

External References

Books featuring Sarah Hall
Torgerson, Mark A. 2012. Greening Spaces for Worship and Ministry: Congregations, Their Buildings, and Creation Care. Herndon: Alban Institute/Rowman & Littlefield. (Page 154 - 155).
Schwebel, Horst, ed. Glasmalerei für das 21. Jahrhundert. (Band II). 2012. Paderborn: Glasmalerei Peters GmbH. (Page 67, 77, 99, 102 - 103, 129).
Porter, J.S. 2011. The Glass Art of Sarah Hall. Herndon: Paderborn: Glasmalerei Peters GmbH.
Philippart, David, ed. 2001. Basket, Basin, Plate, and Cup: Vessels in the Liturgy. Chicago: Liturgy Training Publications. (Cover, page 20).
Crawford, Gail. 1998. A Fine Line: Studio Crafts in Ontario from 1930 to the Present. Toronto: Dundurn Press. (Page 156 - 158).

References

External links
 Sarah Hall Studio Official Website
 Project Overview
 Sarah Hall Glass Library
 Baldwin Collection of Canadiana

1951 births
Living people
Artists from Hamilton, Ontario
Canadian stained glass artists and manufacturers
Religious artists
Canadian glass artists
Women glass artists
Members of the Royal Canadian Academy of Arts
Canadian women artists
Members of the Order of Canada